North Hollywood Shootout is American jam band Blues Traveler's tenth studio album, released on August 26, 2008, and produced by David Bianco, a 1996 Grammy winner. In a notable departure from previous Blues Traveler releases, the album includes a spoken word piece featuring Bruce Willis.

This album marked the band's return to Universal Music Group, which owns their previous label A&M Records, and also their current label, Verve Forecast Records (along with the catalog of Sanctuary Records, another label the band was on at one point).

History 
During early writing and production of this album, the members of Blues Traveler began to experiment with re-arrangements of various older songs, and put this album on hold to record Cover Yourself for their twentieth anniversary. The recording sessions for the two albums were held back-to-back.

Track listing 

Early reports cite the disc as having 11 tracks, but the supposedly official track listing released to amazon.com had only 10 tracks listed on it. However, a later version of the track listing released on the Barnes and Noble website included the supposedly missing 11th track (apparently track 10), "The Landing,"  along with a 30-second sample of the song. "The Landing" eventually became an iTunes exclusive song.

Personnel 
 John Popper - vocals, harmonica
 Chandler Kinchla - guitars
 Ben Wilson - Keyboards
 Tad Kinchla - Bass
 Brendan Hill - Drums
 Bruce Willis - Vocals, harmonica on "Free Willis"
 Dave Ralicke - Baritone, Tenor and Alto Sax
 Jordan Katz - Trumpet

See also 
 North Hollywood shootout

References 

2008 albums
Blues Traveler albums
Verve Forecast Records albums